Alton Baker Park is located in Eugene, Oregon, United States, near Autzen Stadium. It was named for Alton F. Baker Sr., the eleventh owner (60 years after it was founded) of Eugene's The Guard newspaper (later The Register-Guard). It features duck ponds, bicycle trails, a dog park and a disc golf course, and directly touches the Ferry Street Bridge across the Willamette River.

Other amenities include the Cuthbert Amphitheater, a venue for outdoor musical and drama performances. The amphitheater is named for Fred Cuthbert, the park's designer. PRE TRAIL1st development in Alton Baker Park

Whilamut Natural Area
  
The less developed, eastern part of Alton Baker Park is known as the Wilhamut Natural Area and links to Springfield's Eastgate Woodlands via bicycle paths and open space. "Wilhamut" is a Kalapuya word that means "where the river ripples and runs fast". A ceremony to rename the former East Alton Baker Park took place on September 7, 2002 and included a traditional Kalapuya naming ceremony.

Nobel Peace Park
In April, 2013, the Nobel Peace Laureate Project opened a one-acre parcel inside Alton Baker Park to celebrate the United States recipients of the Nobel Peace Prize. The park within a park is the first Nobel Peace Park in the United States.

The prize recipients honored in the park are

Theodore Roosevelt, 1905
Elihu Root, 1912
Woodrow Wilson, 1919
Charles G. Dawes, 1925
Frank B. Kellogg, 1929
Jane Addams, 1931
Nicholas Murray Butler, 1931
Cordell Hull, 1945
Emily Greene Balch, 1946
John Raleigh Mott, 1946
American Friends Service Committee, 1947
Ralph Bunche, 1950
George Catlett Marshall, 1953
Linus Carl Pauling, 1962
Martin Luther King Jr., 1964
Norman E. Borlaug, 1970
Henry Kissinger, 1973
International Physicians for the Prevention of Nuclear War, 1985
Elie Wiesel, 1986
Jody Williams, 1997
International Campaign to Ban Landmines, 1997
Jimmy Carter, 2002
Al Gore, 2007
Barack Obama, 2009

See also
Pre's Trail

References

External links
The Eugene, Oregon Scale Model Solar System

Parks in Eugene, Oregon
Dog parks in the United States